This articles contains links to topics on conservation in Italy.

Protected areas
List of national parks of Italy
List of regional parks of Italy

Conservation organisation
Lega italiana protezione uccelli (LIPU) (Italian League for Bird Protection)
Italia Nostra (Our Italy, for cultural heritage)

See also
Environment of Italy
List of conservation issues
List of extinct and endangered species of Italy

References